Isiolo North Constituency is an electoral constituency in Kenya. It is one of two constituencies of Isiolo County. The constituency has Seven wards, all electing Members of county assembly to the Isiolo County Assembly. The constituency was established for the 1966 elections.

Members of Parliament

Locations and wards

References 

Constituencies in Eastern Province (Kenya)
1966 establishments in Kenya
Constituencies established in 1966
Constituencies in Isiolo County